Aven d'Orgnac is a cave located near Orgnac-l'Aven, in the Ardèche département, France.

it was discovered in 1935 by Robert de Joly and has been open to the public since 1939. It is one of the most visited attractions in the area.

Bibliography in French

.

External links

Official website

Limestone caves
Show caves in France
Landforms of Ardèche
Tourist attractions in Ardèche
Caves of Auvergne-Rhône-Alpes
Vivarais